Joseph Peter Stadtmueller (born January 28, 1942) is an American lawyer and a United States district judge for the United States District Court for the Eastern District of Wisconsin since 1987.  He was Chief Judge of the Eastern District of Wisconsin from 1995 to 2002.

Education and career

Born in Oshkosh, Wisconsin, Stadtmueller received a Bachelor of Arts degree from Marquette University in 1964 and a Juris Doctor from Marquette University Law School in 1967. He was in private practice in Milwaukee from 1968 to 1969. He was an Assistant United States Attorney of the Eastern District of Wisconsin from 1969 to 1974, and then first assistant for that district from 1974 to 1975. He returned to private practice from 1975 to 1976, but was again an Assistant United States Attorney from 1977 to 1978, then the Deputy United States Attorney from 1978 to 1981, finally becoming the United States Attorney for the Eastern District of Wisconsin from 1981 to 1987.

Federal judicial service

On March 3, 1987, Stadtmueller was nominated by President Ronald Reagan to a seat on the United States District Court for the Eastern District of Wisconsin vacated when Judge John W. Reynolds, Jr., took senior status. Stadtmueller was confirmed by the United States Senate on May 19, 1987, and received his commission on June 1, 1987. He served as Chief Judge from 1995 to 2002.

References

Sources
 

1942 births
Living people
20th-century American judges
21st-century American judges
Assistant United States Attorneys
Judges of the United States District Court for the Eastern District of Wisconsin
Marquette University alumni
Marquette University Law School alumni
United States Attorneys for the Eastern District of Wisconsin
United States district court judges appointed by Ronald Reagan